Mehmet Aksu (born 11 January 1980) is a Turkish retired footballer who played as a forward.

References

External links
 
 

1980 births
Living people
Turkish footballers
Footballers from Istanbul
Association football forwards
Galatasaray S.K. footballers
Beykozspor footballers
Bakırköyspor footballers
Malatyaspor footballers
Beşiktaş J.K. footballers
Karşıyaka S.K. footballers
Antalyaspor footballers
FC Rostov players
FC Zhenis Astana players
İstanbulspor footballers
Eyüpspor footballers
Adanaspor footballers
Tepecikspor footballers
Doğan Türk Birliği footballers
Süper Lig players
TFF First League players
TFF Second League players
TFF Third League players
Russian Premier League players
Kazakhstan Premier League players
Turkey youth international footballers
Turkish expatriate footballers
Expatriate footballers in Russia
Turkish expatriate sportspeople in Russia
Expatriate footballers in Kazakhstan
Expatriate footballers in Northern Cyprus
Turkish expatriate sportspeople in Northern Cyprus
Turkish expatriate sportspeople in Kazakhstan